Robert Harold West (born  October 3, 1950) is a former American football wide receiver in the National Football League (NFL) for the Kansas City Chiefs and San Francisco 49ers. He played college football at San Diego State University.

Early years
West attended Lincoln High School, before moving on to San Diego State University, where he played under head coach Don Coryell and was a three-year starter at wide receiver.

In 1971, he set a school record for the longest pass play when he caught a 92-yard pass from quarterback Brian Sipe, while playing against Fresno State University.

Professional career

Dallas Cowboys
West was selected by the Dallas Cowboys in the fourth round (90th overall) of the 1972 NFL Draft. He was released on September 11.

Kansas City Chiefs
On September 13, 1972, he was claimed off waivers by the Kansas City Chiefs. As a rookie, he appeared in 11 games (5 starts), registering 9 receptions for 165 yards and 2 touchdowns. The next year, he appeared in 8 games as a backup. On September 8, 1974, he was traded to the San Francisco 49ers in exchange for a sixth round draft choice (#139-Dave Wasick).

San Francisco 49ers
In 1974, he appeared in 10 games as a backup. On July 24, 1975, having a surplus at wide receiver, the San Francisco 49ers traded him to the Oakland Raiders in exchange for a future draft choice (not exercised).

Oakland Raiders
West was released by the Oakland Raiders on August 12, 1975.

References

1950 births
Living people
Players of American football from San Diego
American football wide receivers
San Diego State Aztecs football players
Kansas City Chiefs players
San Francisco 49ers players